Kjellerup is a Danish town with a population of 5,064 (1 January 2022) It is located 17 km north from Silkeborg and 20 km south from Viborg in Central Jutland.

The town was the seat of the former Kjellerup Municipality.

Notable people
 Ditlev Trappo Saugmand Bjerregaard (1852 in Højbjerg – 1916 in Kjellerup) a businessman, traditional musician and composer of traditional dance music, owned a music shop in Kjellerup
 Søren Malling (born 1964) a Danish actor, raised and lives in Kjellerup 
 Henrik Vibskov (born 1972 in Kjellerup) a Danish fashion designer
 Henrik Pedersen (born 1975 in Kjellerup) a retired Danish footballer, 398 club caps and 3 for Denmark
 Svend-Allan Sørensen (born 1975) a conceptual artist of figured birds
 Thomas Holm (born 1978) singer-songwriter, born and raised in Kjellerup

References

 
Cities and towns in the Central Denmark Region
Silkeborg Municipality